Cai Bingfen was a Chinese footballer who played as a forward for the Chinese national football team.

Career statistics

International

International goals
Scores and results list China's goal tally first.

References

Chinese footballers
China international footballers
Association football forwards